Two:Thirteen (sometimes titled 2wo:Thirteen, or simply 2:13 ), is a 2009 horror/thriller film directed by Charles Adelman and starring Mark Thompson, Mark Pellegrino, Teri Polo, and Kevin Pollak.

Synopsis
Despite suffering a traumatic past and battling a drinking problem, Russell Spivey is a successful police profiler.  When he rejoins his team after a stint on psychiatric leave and finds himself on the trail of a serial killer, he must set aside his personal issues and do what he does best - delve into the mind of a murderer.  But as Spivey gets closer to solving the case, it appears that the killer is now targeting him.  Each victim is found with a mask - an all-too-familiar object of his childhood - and word games that leave him puzzled.  Spivey must catch up with the Masked Murderer before he loses everyone he loves and his future becomes just as dark as his past.

Cast

References

External links
 Official website

 

2009 films
2009 psychological thriller films
American serial killer films
American psychological thriller films
2009 horror films
2000s English-language films
2000s American films